Events from the year 2010 in Indonesia

Incumbents

Events
 April 7: April 2010 Sumatra earthquake
 April 13: Merpati Nusantara Airlines Flight 836
 April 25 – 30: 2010 World Geothermal Congress
 May 9: May 2010 Northern Sumatra earthquake
 May 22:  Mount_Rinjani erupted three times
 May – June: Indonesia 2010 census
 June 1: Miss Indonesia 2010
 June 16: 2010 Papua earthquake
 October: 2010 eruptions of Mount Merapi
 October 2: Petarukan train collision
 October 6: 2010 West Papua floods
 October 8: Puteri Indonesia 2010
 October 25: 2010 Mentawai earthquake and tsunami
 November 4: Qantas Flight 32

Television

The following TV shows debuted this year in Indonesia.

 Indonesia's Got Talent
 Katakan Katamu
 Putri yang Ditukar
 Who Wants to Be a Millionaire Hot Seat (Indonesian game show)

Sport

 2010 Indonesia national football team results
 2009–10 Indonesia Super League
 2009–10 Liga Indonesia Premier Division
 2010 Commonwealth Bank Tournament of Champions
 2010 Asian Women's Club Volleyball Championship
 2010 Indonesia Super Series
 Indonesia at the 2010 Asian Games
 Indonesia at the 2010 Asian Beach Games
 Indonesia at the 2010 Summer Youth Olympics
 Indonesia at the 2010 Asian Para Games

 
Indonesia